Calliostoma otukai is a species of sea snail, a marine gastropod mollusk in the family Calliostomatidae.

Some authors place this taxon in the subgenus Calliostoma (Otukaia).

Description

Distribution

References

 Sakurai, K. (1994). Eight new species of Trochid Genera, Tristichotrochus, Kombologion and Otukaia (Calliostomatinae) from Japan and adjacent waters . Jap. Jour. Malac. (4) 53 : 287-296
 Higo, S., Callomon, P. & Goto, Y. (1999). Catalogue and bibliography of the marine shell-bearing Mollusca of Japan. Osaka. : Elle Scientific Publications. 749 pp.

External links

otukai
Gastropods described in 1942